The Fatal Warning is a 1929 mystery silent film serial directed by Richard Thorpe for Mascot. The film is considered to be a lost film, with no prints known to exist. It co-starred Boris Karloff.

Plot
After William Rogers, a bank executive, disappears, he is charged with embezzling money from the bank. But his daughter Dorothy asks her criminologist friend Russell Thorne to help her find her missing father and restore his good name.

Cast 
 Helene Costello as Dorothy Rogers
 Ralph Graves as Russell Thorne
 George Periolat as William Rogers
 Phillips Smalley as Leonard Taylor
 Boris Karloff as Mullins
 Lloyd Whitlock as Norman Brooks
 Syd Crossley as Dawson
 Thomas G. Lingham as John Harman
 Symona Boniface as Marie Jordan
 Martha Mattox as Mrs. Charles Peterson
 Gertrude Astor

See also
List of lost films

References

External links

1929 films
1929 mystery films
1929 lost films
American silent serial films
American mystery films
American black-and-white films
Films directed by Richard Thorpe
Films produced by Nat Levine
Lost American films
Lost mystery films
Mascot Pictures film serials
1920s American films
Silent mystery films